Łukasz Wietecki (born September 27, 1984) is a Polish paratriathlete and former middle distance runner who competes in international level events. He has participated at the Paralympic Games in 2012 and 2016 in athletics but did not medal in any of his finals.

Wietecki switched to paratriathlon in 2014 and is a World bronze medalist and a three time European medalist. He trains in Poznań and is aiming to compete at the 2020 Summer Paralympics.

References

1984 births
Living people
Paralympic athletes of Poland
Paratriathletes of Poland
Polish male middle-distance runners
Athletes (track and field) at the 2012 Summer Paralympics
Athletes (track and field) at the 2016 Summer Paralympics
Medalists at the World Para Athletics Championships
Medalists at the World Para Athletics European Championships
Visually impaired middle-distance runners
Paralympic middle-distance runners
21st-century Polish people